Story Of Abbey is an Australian rock opera created by David McLean. It opened at the Seymour Centre in November 2002 for a run of nine days.

A soundtrack album, credited to Play Act One, was released in 2001 and was nominated for the 2002 ARIA Award for Best Cast/Show Album.

Story Of Abbey got mixed reviews. Writing in the Sydney Morning Herald, Stephen Dunne states that the opera "has two central weaknesses: a score that doesn't contain a single good song, and a dull narrative of decline that is almost incomprehensible." Commenting on the soundtrack, The Newcastle Herald's Chad Watson calls it an "extraordinary tale of an ordinary woman."

Personnel

Cast
 Yeh Lee - Abbey
 David McLean

Crew
 David McLean - Writer, Producer
 Yeh Lee - Producer
 Gavin Mitford - Choreographer

Track listing
 Jackal's Play
 Run To The Shadows (Letter)
 Sonnet
 Fly Away (Puddles)
 Dogs Are Howling (Swings)
 Follow Me (Trumpet)
 Choir Of Angels
 Happy Faces
 Mr Magic Man
 Christmas
 Crack On The Street
 Sweet Lady
 Tomorrow I Will
 Abbey
 Suffering
 Go Away
 Reach Out
 Angel As My Witness
 A Little Light
 Her Knife
 Forest

References

Soundtracks by Australian artists
2001 soundtrack albums
2002 musicals
Australian musicals